CKOT may refer to:

 CKOT-FM, a radio station (101.3 FM) licensed to Tillsonburg, Ontario, Canada
 CKOT (AM), a radio station (1510 AM) licensed to Tillsonburg, Ontario, Canada which  operated from 1955 until it left the air in 2013.